Earl Rogers Sayers was an American professor of biology and college administrator. He was educated at University of Illinois with a bachelor's degree in 1958. He later received a master's degree in 1961 and a Ph.D. in 1964 from Cornell University. He served as president of the University of Alabama from 1988 to 1996.

References

1936 births
University of Illinois alumni
Cornell University alumni
University of Alabama faculty
Presidents of the University of Alabama
Living people